The 2004 Ole Miss Rebels football team represented the University of Mississippi during the 2004 NCAA Division I-A football season. They participated in the Southeastern Conference in the Western Division. The team played their home games at Vaught–Hemingway Stadium in Oxford, Mississippi. They were coached by head coach David Cutcliffe.

Schedule

Personnel

References

Ole Miss
Ole Miss Rebels football seasons
Ole Miss Rebels football